The 1924–28 Nordic Football Championship was the first Nordic Football Championship staged. Three Nordic countries participated, Denmark, Norway and Sweden. The tournament was arranged by the Danish Football Association (DBU) which celebrated its 35th anniversary. The trophy was named the Jubilæumspokal (Anniversary Trophy). A total of 15 matches were played and 73 goals scored giving an average of 4.87 goals per match.

Participants
The participants were:

Results

1924

1925

1926

1927

1928

Table

Winner

Statistics

Goalscorers

See also
Balkan CupBaltic CupCentral European International CupMediterranean Cup

References

External links 
Nordic Championships 1924-28 at RSSSF

1924-28
1924–25 in European football
1925–26 in European football
1926–27 in European football
1927–28 in European football
1924–25 in Swedish football
1925–26 in Swedish football
1926–27 in Swedish football
1927–28 in Swedish football
1924–25 in Danish football
1925–26 in Danish football
1926–27 in Danish football
1927–28 in Danish football
1924 in Norwegian football
1925 in Norwegian football
1926 in Norwegian football
1927 in Norwegian football
1928 in Norwegian football